Megyei Bajnokság I is the fourth tier of Hungarian football league system. It includes the championships of the 20 counties of Hungary. The champions might be promoted to the Nemzeti Bajnokság III.

Champions

Notes
 Note 1: did not want to compete in Nemzeti Bajnokság III

External links
Official page (Hungarian)
Megyei Bajnokság I on Magyarfutball.hu

References

 
4
Hun
Professional sports leagues in Hungary